Kåre Bjørnsen (17 July 1934 – 6 March 1993) was a Norwegian footballer. He played in one match for the Norway national football team in 1960.

References

External links
 

1934 births
1993 deaths
Norwegian footballers
Norway international footballers
Place of birth missing
Association football defenders
Viking FK players